Tropical Storm Julio was a weak and short-lived tropical storm that made landfall along the southern Mexican coast. The tenth named storm from the 2002 Pacific hurricane season. Julio's origin was an area of convection organized into a tropical depression on September 25. Initially forecast to stay offshore, the depression headed northward and strengthened into a tropical storm that same day. Julio turned to the northwest and peaked as a minimal tropical storm just before landfall near Lázaro Cárdenas, on September 26. The storm soon weakened into a tropical depression and later on September 26, it rapidly dissipated over Mexico.

Prior to making landfall, tropical cyclone warnings and watches were issued for a portion of the Pacific coast of Mexico. After making landfall, three fatalities and 18 injuries were reported from Julio when a bus flipped over. Around 100 houses in Acapulco and Zihuatanejo were damaged or washed away by flash flooding. In the latter city, many trees were brought down and numerous streets were flooded. In all, about 2,000 homes were flooded while 100 families were evacuated. About a month after Julio, Hurricane Kenna affected some of the same locations as Julio.

Meteorological history

The origins of Tropical Storm Julio were from a persistent monsoon-like area of convection (possibly related to Hurricane Isidore) that was situated off the west coast of Central America on September 21. Convective activity generally increased over the next two days, and it is estimated that a poorly defined surface circulation developed late on September 23.

Shortly thereafter, the NHC upgraded the depression into Tropical Storm Julio based on intensity estimates from the Dvorak technique. By this time, Julio was now expected to move onshore the Mexican coast and meander. At peak, the storm was centered just west-northwest of Lázaro Cárdenas. After turning northwest, Julio made landfall along the coast of Southwestern Mexico. After landfall, Julio rapidly deteriorated over the mountainous terrain. At 1200 UTC September 26, the storm was downgraded into a tropical depression. Even though the storm was initially expected to enter the extreme southern Gulf of California and regain tropical storm strength, Julio dissipated near Manzanillo later that day instead.

Preparations, impact, and aftermath

Upon becoming a tropical cyclone, tropical cyclone warnings and watches were issued for portions of the Pacific coast of Mexico; a tropical storm warning was issued from Zihuatanejo to Punta San Telma while a tropical storm watch was in effect from Punta San Telma to Manzanillo. On September 26, once the storm had weakened into a depression over land, all the watches and warnings were dropped. Record rainfall was reported in Guerrero.

Tropical Storm Julio was responsible for heavy rains to Zihuatanejo, where 100 homes were damaged or destroyed. Across the city, numerous roofs were damaged and many trees fell. Many houses and streets were flooded as well. Meanwhile, in Acapulco, heavy rains triggered flash flooding that damaged another 100 houses. Throughout Colima, many rivers overflowed its banks. Furthermore, 2,000 homes were flooded. Roughly 100 families were evacuated to shelters in Michoacán.

In addition, many small shacks lost their roof due to the storm's high winds. An estimated 2700 acres (700 ha) of crops were lost because of the storm. Parts of Guerrero were later declared a disaster area. However, the city of Zihuaranejo was quickly cleaned up proceeding the storm. About a month after Julio, Hurricane Kenna affected some of the same locations that Julio impacted.

See also
Other storms of the same name
Tropical Storm Olaf (1997)
Tropical Storm Odile (2008)

References

2002 in Mexico
Julio
Julio 2002
Julio 2002
Julio